Stegienka  is a village in the administrative district of Gmina Stegna, within Nowy Dwór Gdański County, Pomeranian Voivodeship, in northern Poland.

Before 1793 the area was part of Polish Royal Prussia, in 1793–1919 Prussia and Germany, 1920–1939 the Free City of Danzig, 1939–45 Nazi Germany. It became Polish in 1945. For the history of the region, see History of Pomerania.

In 2008 the village had a population of 330.

References

Stegienka